Graves disease, susceptibility to, X-linked is a protein that in humans is encoded by the GRDX gene.

References 

Genes
Human proteins